Static load testing is an in situ type of load testing used in geotechnical investigation to determine the bearing capacity of deep foundations prior to the construction of a building. It differs from the statnamic load test and dynamic load testing in that the pressure applied to the pile is slower. Static load testings are performed in order to measure a design's axial tension or axial compression. It can also be used to measure its deflected shape under lateral load

Kentledge load testing method
Kentledge refers to iron weights used as permanent ship  ballast, or iron or concrete weights used in load testing. This method involves the construction of a platform upon which massive weights are placed. These weights bear down on the pile putting it under load. Gauges measure resistance, movement of the pile, and other readings to determine the properties of the ground.

Bi-directional load testing method
Bi-directional Static Load Test is a steadfast Maintained Load Test option for both large and small diameter piles that is widely used in the market. The main difference between a top-loaded maintained load test and a Bi-Directional is the location of the jack. One of the types of bi-directional method is YJACK method.

A sacrificial and embedded hydraulic jack is cast within the pile body. Upon application of load, the pile is separated into two sections and load is applied to both sections simultaneously and reacting against each other in two directions; upward against upper skin friction and downward against base end bearing and lower skin friction. Practically, the bi-directional pile load test does not require reaction beams, anchor piles or Kentledge during load applying. However, technically bi-directional is equivalent to static load test method. In other words, bi-directional simulates the static load test results.

Practically, the bi-directional pile load test does not require reaction beams, anchor piles or Kentledge during load applying. However, technically bi-directional is equivalent to static load test method. In other words, bi-directional simulates the static load test results.

With the analogy, if the static load test reaction system (either Kentledge or anchor piles) covered by soil and apply loading, the system becomes bi-directional. The hydraulic jack in static load test becomes bi-directional jack. The load applying on bi-directional is exactly same as static load test method with designated loading steps.

References

External links

In situ foundation tests
Deep foundations